Srečko Brodar (May 6, 1893 – April 27, 1987) was a Slovene archaeologist, internationally best known for excavation of Potok Cave, an Upper Palaeolithic cave site in northern Slovenia.

Life
Brodar studied at the University of Vienna and University of Zagreb, graduating in 1920. Beginning in 1921, he taught at Celje Grammar School, and after the First World War, during which he received a serious elbow injury, he in 1939 received his PhD from the University of Ljubljana, and became a professor there in 1946, serving as the chair of Archaeological Department until retirement. Brodar was the director of the Institute of Archaeology at the Slovenian Academy of Sciences and Arts, and a member of the International Union for Prehistoric and Protohistoric Sciences. His son Mitja Brodar (1921–2012) was also a noted archaeologist.

Work
In 1928, he became famous with the excavation of Potok Cave and five other Palaeolithic sites in Slovenia, demonstrating the link between the Palaeolithic cultures of the eastern Alps and those of the Pannonian Plain and northern Italy.

After World War II, Brodar's research focused on Betal Rock Shelter, a multiperiod prehistoric site near Postojna in southwest Slovenia. He also discovered the first Mesolithic sites in Slovenia, such as Špehovka Cave.

Awards
 1949 Prešeren Award for excavations at Betal Rock Shelter.
 1960 Prešeren Award for excavations at Črni Kal
 1974 Kidrič Award

References

Further reading
 Likar, Peter (1996). Odkril sem Potočko Zijalko (a transcript of a 1970s documentary film about Srečko Brodar)

External links

1893 births
1987 deaths
Slovenian archaeologists
Yugoslav geologists
Slovenian paleontologists
Prešeren Award laureates
University of Zagreb alumni
University of Ljubljana alumni
Academic staff of the University of Ljubljana
Yugoslav archaeologists